George Thomas Barnes (August 14, 1833 – October 24, 1901) was a Georgia state legislator, military officer, and  United States Representative.

Biography
Barnes was born in the Summerville suburb of Augusta, Georgia. He graduated from the University of Georgia (UGA) in Athens in 1855 with a Bachelor of Arts (A.B. degree. He was admitted to the state bar in 1855 and became a practicing lawyer in Augusta.

During the American Civil War, Barnes served as a second lieutenant and major brevet in the Confederate States Army as a member of the Washington Light Artillery Company. He was also a member of the Georgia House of Representatives from 1860 through 1865. From 1876 through 1884, Barnes served on the Democratic National Committee.

In 1884, Barnes was elected as a Democrat to the 49th United States Congress as the Representative for Georgia's 10th congressional district. He was re-elected to that position for two additional terms before losing his bid for reelection in 1890.  After his congressional service, Barnes returned to the practice of law. Barnes was a UGA trustee for the last two years of his life before dying in Augusta on October 24, 1901. He was buried in City Cemetery in that same city.

References

 Retrieved on October 13, 2008
History of the University of Georgia, Thomas Walter Reed,  Imprint:  Athens, Georgia: University of Georgia, c. 1949, pp. 560–561

1833 births
1901 deaths
Politicians from Augusta, Georgia
Democratic Party members of the United States House of Representatives from Georgia (U.S. state)
Democratic Party members of the Georgia House of Representatives
19th-century American politicians
University of Georgia alumni
People of Georgia (U.S. state) in the American Civil War
Confederate States Army officers